This article list the results of men's doubles category in the 2007 BWF World Championships (World Badminton Championships).

Seeds 

  Cai Yun / Fu Haifeng (quarter-finals)
  Koo Kien Keat / Tan Boon Heong (quarter-finals)
  Markis Kido / Hendra Setiawan (world champions)
  Jens Eriksen / Martin Lundgaard Hansen (quarter-finals)
  Candra Wijaya /  Tony Gunawan (quarter-finals)
  Choong Tan Fook / Lee Wan Wah (semi-finals)
  Mohd Zakry Abdul Latif / Mohd Fairuzizuan Mohd Tazari (second round)
  Luluk Hadiyanto / Alvent Yulianto (third round)

  Robert Blair / Anthony Clark (second round)
  Hwang Ji-man / Lee Jae-jin (third round)
  Lars Paaske / Jonas Rasmussen (second round)
  Albertus Susanto Njoto / Yohan Hadikusumo Wiratama (second round)
  Jung Jae-sung / Lee Yong-dae (final)
  Hendra Aprida Gunawan / Joko Riyadi 
  Ong Soon Hock / Tan Bin Shen (first round)
  Shintaro Ikeda / Shuichi Sakamoto (semi-finals)

Draw

Finals

Top half

Section 1

Section 2

Bottom half

Section 3

Section 4

Source 
Tournamentsoftware.com: 2007 World Championships - Men's doubles

- Men's doubles, 2007 BWF World Championships